WHMA-FM (95.3 FM, "The Big 95") is a radio station broadcasting a country music format.  Licensed to Alexandria, Alabama, United States, it serves the Anniston-Oxford metropolitan area.  The station is currently owned by Williams Communications, Inc.

History
The station was originally applied-for by Perry Communications in 1979, with Ashland, Alabama as its city of license.  After being approved in 1980, it was granted two extensions to the original 18 months before its construction permit expired in 1981.  After later being granted a new CP in 1983, it finally went on the air and was given a license to cover in 1984.  During this process, the city of license was changed from Ashland-Lineville, Alabama to its current Hobson City.  The station was WASZ until mid-December 2004.

WHMA-FM has filed an application with the Federal Communications Commission to change its frequency down by one channel, from 95.5 to 95.3 FM.  The station will change its city of license again to Alexandria, Alabama in conjunction with this change.  The station will have the same transmitter location and height, but will drop its power in the maximum direction from 530 watts to 400.  A different directional antenna will also be used, shifting the southern end of its coverage area further west. oldnew A license to cover with the new facilities was granted in April 2019.

The WHMA-FM callsign and radio format were previously on 100.5, which moved all the way to metro Atlanta to become WWWQ (now WNNX) FM in January 2001. WHMA-FM began broadcasting
in 1947 and owned by Consolidated Publishing which printed The Anniston Star newspaper. Licensed to  Anniston, Alabama WHMA was a class C 100,000 watt FM. The present WHMA-FM signed on the air January 2005 as a class A 6000 watt previously licensed to Ashland, Alabama as "Real Country" WASZ 95.5. WHMA-FM sister 
station WHMA-AM signed on the air in 1938. WHMA-AM 
broadcasts on 1390 as "Mighty Power 1390" with a power of
5000 watts daytime and 1000 watts directional night
programming a black gospel format. WHMA-FM played a 
country music format from March 1985-January 2001 and the current WHMA-FM also plays a country format.

History of call letters
The call letters WHMA-FM were earlier assigned to another station in Anniston. It began broadcasting November 10, 1947, on 100.5 MHz. Studios were in the Radio Building in Anniston. The station was licensed to Anniston Broadcasting Company, which also had the license for WHMA (AM).

References

External links

HMA-FM
Country radio stations in the United States
Radio stations established in 1984
Mass media in Calhoun County, Alabama
1984 establishments in Alabama